Taicang  is a county-level city under the jurisdiction of Suzhou, Jiangsu province, China. The city located in the south of the Yangtze River estuary opposite Nantong, being bordered by Shanghai proper to the south, while the river also delineates much of its northeastern boundary along Chongming Island.

Administration
Taicang administers 7 towns:

History

Toponym 
Taicang as a place name is mentioned in a memorial to the throne of geographer Jia Dan during the Song dynasty, "Where lies to the east of Kunshan nowadays", he supposedly wrote, "is called Taicang, also known as Gangshen".

Overview 
Taicang is a natural port. Under the Yuan, the city reached its peak between 1271 and 1368. Under the Ming, Taicang's Liuhe Harbor was the departure point for Zheng He's treasure fleets. It was also during this period that the shoals in the Yangtze estuary which later became Chongming Island were placed under the supervision of Taicang Prefecture.

It was the venue for the 2014 IAAF World Race Walking Cup.

Geography

The Taicang port is in the east of the city, and south of the Yangtze exit into the East China Sea. The center of the Taicang port is on 31°37′00" North, 121°14′00" East. The port line stretches 24.3 miles (38.8 km), of which 15.6 miles can park 50 thousand ton vessels.
Taicang is in a humid subtropical climate zone with distinctive seasons. The average year round temperature is 15.5 Celsius. Precipitation is around 1078.1 mm.

Climate

Economy
Taicang is known for having operations from companies established by Germans since 1985, when the first German businessperson went to Taicang. Accordingly, the city obtained the nickname "Little Swabia" with it having German-inspired businesses. The area does not have a significant German population as the German expatriates prefer Shanghai since it contains the German School of Shanghai. The city has the German Centre for Industry and Trade Taicang.

ABA Chemicals, a chemicals manufacturing company, is headquartered in Taicang.

By 2021 the city had a labor shortage with workers demanding higher wages.

Notable people

 Chien-Shiung Wu, the most famous female physicist in history by acclamation, who built the atomic bomb in the Manhattan Project and disproved the conservation of parity

See also
Jincang Lake, Taicang

External links
 Taicang guide on www.Jiangsu.net

References

 
Cities in Jiangsu
Administrative divisions of Suzhou
County-level divisions of Jiangsu